Fauré ( is an Occitan family name, a variant of Faure. 

Notable people with the surname include:
 Alain Fauré (1962–2018), French politician
 Amédée Fauré or Victor-Amédée Faure (1801–1878), French painter
 Andrée Fauré (1904–1985), French ceramist and designer, daughter of Camille Fauré
 Antoine Fauré (1883–1954), French cyclist
 Camille Fauré (1874–1956), French ceramicist
 Cédric Fauré (born 1979), French football striker
 Emmanuel Fauré-Fremiet (1883–1971), French biologist, son of Gabriel Fauré
 Gabriel Fauré (1845–1924), French composer
 Gérard Fauré (born 1946), French essayist, former drug dealer and bank robber
 Maurice Fauré (1859–1945), French sports shooter
 Nicolas Fauré (born 1984), French rugby league player
 Sylvain Fauré (born 1978), Monegasque swimmer

See also
 Faure
 Foray, Foray (surname)

Occitan-language surnames